The weightlifting competitions at the 2005 Mediterranean Games in Almería took place between 25 June and 30 June at the Antonio Rivera Youth Sports Hall.

Athletes competed in 26 events across 13 weight categories (8 for men and 5 for women). Two Women's (75 kg and +75 kg) category will not be held because too few nations applied.

Medal summary

Men's events

Women's events

Medal table
Key:

References

External links
 Official results

2005
2005 in weightlifting